Corridor of Mirrors is Prometheus's (Benji Vaughan) second album.

Track listing 

 Arcadia Magik (8:51)
 One Cell Short Of A Brain (6:50)
 Drug Sock (7:37)
 The Logic Of The Polyphonic (8:19)
 9th (The Man Who Swam Through A Speaker) (8:08)
 Soma (7:38)
 Oz (7:35)
 Cherry Pie (8:46)

External links 
 Release info on Discogs.com

2007 albums
Albums produced by Benji Vaughan